The LPO-50 (Lyogkiy Pyekhotnyy Ognyemyot (Легкий Пехотный Огнемет), "Light Infantry Flamethrower") is a Soviet flamethrower.

Developed in 1953 to replace the ROKS-2/3 flamethrowers used during World War Two, it was kept in the inventory well into the 1980s. This model was designed as a lightweight, manpack flamethrower with three upright cylinders and a bipod-mounted flame gun. It differed from Western flamethrowers in that it used special ignition cartridges to expel the thickened fuel mixture rather than an inert gas. During the 1960s, the weapon was manufactured by the People's Republic of China.  It was replaced in Soviet service by the RPO "Rys" and RPO-A Shmel incendiary rocket launchers in the 1980s.

The LPO saw service in the Vietnam War. Viet Cong forces were reported to have used the flamethrower at the 1967 Đắk Sơn massacre. At least one was used in an attack on the USMC base at Con Thien (also in 1967), and there were several captured ones on display in Saigon in 1972.

The United States Congress in 2011 cites an Irish Times article, reporting that the Irish Republican Army had an estimated 6 units of this model of flamethrower (prior to 2001). A LPO-50 was used in an attack on a British army checkpoint in 1989.

Users

 
 
Provisional Irish Republican Army

References 

Flamethrowers of the Soviet Union
Cold War weapons of the Soviet Union
Military equipment introduced in the 1950s